Pine Gully Park is a  park located in Seabrook, Texas in the United States, near Houston. It is located on the shore of Galveston Bay. The park belongs to the Seabrook Trail System and includes undeveloped and restored woodlands, salt marshes and several species of wildlife.

The park
Though the park has some traditional recreational facilities it also features a great deal of largely undeveloped and restored woodlands and salt marshes which offer habitats for numerous animal species.

The park is part of the Seabrook Trail System, which connects most of the parks in the city. As part of this system the park is part of a larger collection of wildlife habitats in Seabrook which are all near the much larger Armand Bayou Nature Center. The park is also part of the Great Texas Coastal Birding Trail, which includes bird watching sites, sanctuaries, and trails along the entire Texas Gulf Coast.

Park wildlife includes American alligators, herons, king rails, white-tailed deer, nine-banded armadillos, and many other species. Apart from its natural scenery, the park features a preserved Karankawa camp site.

The park is the venue for the annual Seabrook Lucky Trails Marathon.

There is a $10 entry fee (per vehicle) for non-Seabrook residents Monday-Thursday and a $20 entry fee (per vehicle) for non-Seabrook residents Friday-Sunday. Residents of the city of Seabrook receive free admission for themselves and all guests in their vehicle.

See also
 Galveston Bay Area
 Greater Houston

Notes

References

External links
 Seabrook Parks

Nature reserves in Texas
Parks in Texas
Protected areas of Harris County, Texas
Galveston Bay Area